Michael Peter Skelly (born October 19, 1961) is a Houston renewable energy and infrastructure developer and entrepreneur. He is the former Democratic candidate for Texas's 7th congressional district in the U.S. House of Representatives. From 1999 to 2008, he served as the chief development officer for Horizon Wind Energy, which by 2007 had become the second-largest wind farm developer and third-largest wind farm owner in the United States. Skelly cofounded and served as president of Clean Line Energy Partners, an independent developer of high voltage direct current, long-haul transmission lines until 2018. Skelly's work at Clean Line is detailed in the book, "Superpower: One Man's Quest to Transform American Energy" by Wall Street Energy reporter and Pulitzer Prize finalist Russell Gold. Skelly is CEO of Grid United, an independent transmission development company.

Family and personal life

Early life and education 
Michael Skelly was born in England in 1961 to Irish Parents. At the age of two, Skelly sailed to the United States from Ireland with his family aboard the SS America. His parents settled in Roanoke, Virginia where Skelly attended public schools.  He went on to earn his undergraduate degree from the University of Notre Dame. After college, he joined the Peace Corps and served in Costa Rica, where he helped local fisherman develop a microcredit market to increase their economic viability after the Latin American economic crisis of the 1980s. Following the Peace Corps, Skelly enrolled in Harvard Business School, where he earned his M.B.A.

Adult life 
Skelly has been married to Anne Whitlock since 1991. The couple has three grown children: two boys and a girl. Anne earned a degree in Business Finance from the University of Massachusetts Amherst and a degree in Public Policy from the John F. Kennedy School of Government at Harvard. Anne is the Founding Director of Connect Community, an organization that works with the largely immigrant Gulfton and Sharpstown neighborhoods of Houston. The organization connects the community to resources it can collaborate with to strengthen itself socioeconomically. In 2013 Skelly and Whitlock purchased the hundred year old Houston Firehouse No. 2, which had fallen into disrepair since its decommissioning in the 1980s. With their children out on their own, the couple renovated the firehouse, turning the downstairs into a community and events space and the upstairs into their residence. Skelly and Whitlock were named as one of Houston's 29 most powerful couples by the Houston Chronicle in 2021.

Kidney donation 
In February 2011, Skelly donated a kidney to his sister, Margaret. After becoming a donor, Skelly became an advocate for living donor programs, becoming a member on the Advisory board of Living Bank, a Houston-based organization that works to advance living organ donation to confront the shortage of organs needed for life-saving transplants. On May 2, 2014 Skelly co-hosted a Cabaret gala fundraiser for Nora's Home - an outpatient facility designed for transplant recipients to recover. In October 2017, Living Bank hosted their annual Celebrate Life Fundraiser featuring Skelly as special honoree.

Business career

Aerial tram 
In 1992, Skelly and his partners began the development of an aerial tram adjacent to the Braulio Carrillo National Park of Costa Rica to promote ecotourism. Skelly navigated logistical, financial and bureaucratic challenges in order to complete the project. The tram equipment was purchased from a U.S. ski resort. Skelly secured a helicopter from the Nicaraguan government to install the tram towers in the dense rainforest through connections he made at Harvard. The project was completed in 1994. The open-air tram is a mile long and rises to the rainforest canopy to deliver guests an up-close view of the incredibly biodiverse ecosystem. The tram is still operational today.

New World Power 
After developing the Aerial Tram, Skelly went to work for New World Power to develop renewable energy projects in 1995. Soon after he was brought on board, the company began liquidating assets. By 1996 New World Power had gone out of business and Skelly was forced to move on.

Energia Global 
Skelly joined Energia Global in 1996, developing small energy projects in Central America. Skelly led Energia Global's efforts for a proposed wind farm, Tierras Morenas. Tierras Morenas would be the largest wind farm in Costa Rica, and at the time was one of the largest in Latin America. In order to purchase the wind farm site, Energia Global required a financial partner to invest capital. Skelly forged a partnership with Texan investor and co-owner of International Wind, Michael Zilkha. By 1999, the project was completed and contributing electricity to the Costa Rican grid. In 2001, 4% of the nations power was generated at Tierras Morenas and two smaller wind farms.

Horizon Wind Energy 
Skelly moved to Houston to work as Chief Development Officer for International Wind in 1999, the company that had partnered with Energia Global on the Tierras Morenas wind farm. Michael Zilkha and his father, Selim Zilkha, owned 50% of International Wind until 2000, when they bought out the other 50% interest and renamed the company Zilkha Renewable Energy. The company developed wind farms across the country including the 75 megawatt (MW) Blue Canyon Wind Farm in Oklahoma and 320 MW Maple Ridge Wind Farm in New York. Goldman Sachs purchased Zilkha Renewable in 2005 and the company was rebranded Horizon Wind Energy. At the time of acquisition, Zilkha Renewables had 4,000 megawatts of wind-energy projects under development in 12 states. In 2005, wind power accounted for less than 1% of electricity generated in the United States. In 2006, the Houston Business Journal quoted Skelly as saying, "Houston is the center of energy, and as renewable energy, including wind, plays a bigger role. There is an opportunity for Houston to be involved in the growth for that segment." Goldman Sachs sold Horizon, which had grown to the third largest wind company in the United States, to EDP Renewables for $2.2 billion for a reported gain of nearly $1 billion.

Wind Energy Person of the Year 
In 2008, the American Wind Energy Association named Michael Skelly "Wind Energy Person of the Year" at the WindPower 2008 Conference.

Clean Line Energy partners 

His work at Clean Line Energy Partners and Horizon Wind Energy is described in detail in the book Superpower by Russell Gold. In 2009, Skelly founded Clean Line Energy Partners, a company focused on moving energy from resource areas to distant consumer markets. Independent studies by the National Oceanic and Atmospheric Administration (NOAA) and National Renewable Energy Laboratory (NREL) have shown that in order for the United States to efficiently use renewable energy, the country's power grid must be updated to include long-distance transmission lines. The NOAA study demonstrated the U.S. could reduce carbon-dioxide emissions by 80%, using only existing technologies, and the NREL study showed the U.S. power grid must be updated for the country to run on 30% renewable energy. Clean Line was an independent developer of high voltage direct current (HVDC), long-haul transmission lines, wanting to provide transmission solutions to generators and load-serving utilities in order to interconnect all sources of energy with consumers. Clean line faced numerous bureaucratic challenges while attempting to develop their HVDC transmission lines. The company had four proposed transmission line projects; Plains and Eastern Clean Line, Grainbelt Express Clean Line, Western Spirit Clean Line and Mesa Canyons Wind Farm, and Rock Island Clean Line. The Plains and Eastern Clean Line came the closest to being developed. Plains and Eastern was to deliver up to 4,000 MW from Oklahoma Panhandle wind farms to a Tennessee Valley Authority (TVA) substation outside of Memphis for offloading power onto the TVA grid and for sale to southeastern utilities. Skelly offered to sell the TVA power at as low as 2 cents per kilowatt hour. Ultimately, the TVA decided not to purchase power from the Plains and Eastern Clean Line, giving up the opportunity to lower costs for their ratepayers and add more renewables to their portfolio and that of the greater Southeast. After ten years of hard work, and no developed HVDC lines, Skelly was forced to sell off the projects to other energy developers. Many of the permits and approvals for these projects still exist and they may be developed in the future. New Mexico utility PNM was approved by the New Mexico Public Regulation Commission (NMPRC) to acquire the Western Spirit transmission project in 2019. The Western Spirit transmission project was acquired from Pattern Energy Group and the New Mexico Renewable Energy Transmission Authority. who will develop and construct the project. The project will transmit 800 MW of wind energy. PNM expects the project to be finished in 2021. In July 2020, Invenergy won a court ruling to acquire the 780 mile Grain Belt Express Clean Line. The project will carry up to 4,000 MW of wind power from western Kansans to a substation in Kansas, where the energy will be distributed to the 11-state market of grid operator PJM.

Lazard 
In 2018, Skelly joined investment bank Lazard as a senior advisor on renewables.

Grid United 
In 2021 Skelly founded Grid United, a company focused on early stage development of early stage and high voltage direct current (HVDC) transmission. The goals of the company are to tie regional grids together to improve resiliency to climate-induced natural disasters, increase reliability of cheap renewable energy and reduce hazards to human health related to fossil fuel energy production. Skelly serves as CEO.

U.S. Secretary of Energy Advisory Board 
In October, 2021, Skelly was appointed to a two-year term on the United States Department of Energy (DOE) Secretary of Energy Advisory Board (SEAB). Skelly was appointed by U.S. Secretary of Energy, Jennifer Granholm. The SEAB meets quarterly and "provides advice and recommendations to the Secretary of Energy on the Administration's energy policies, the Department's basic and applied research and development activities, economic and national security policy, and on any other activities and operations of the Department of Energy, as the Secretary may direct."

2008 Congressional Campaign

In November 2008, Skelly faced three-term incumbent John Culberson in the election for Texas' 7th district. Skelly's campaign received national attention for its fundraising efforts.Ultimately, Skelly lost the election to Culberson by 42% to 56% of the vote, respectively.

Community leadership

Board leadership

LINK Houston 

Michael serves as a board member of LINK Houston. LINK's mission is to advocate for an equitable public transit network in Houston, where owning a car is not a necessity to traverse the city. Lack of transportation is a barrier to opportunity, i.e. affordable housing, education, work, healthcare, and grocery shopping. Low housing costs in Houston are often offset by car and travel related expenses. Reducing bicycle and pedestrian involved car accidents is a priority of LINK through increased access and safety measures.

Houston Bike Share 
Skelly is a board member for the nonprofit Houston Bike Share. Houston Bike Share operates Houston BCycle, a program operating 113 rental stations and 800 bicycles. Bike's can either be rented on as-needed basis via credit card kiosk or mobile app.

Make I-45 Better Coalition 
The Texas Department of Transportation (TxDOT) has proposed plans to expand highway I-45 through Houston. There has been widespread critique of the project concerning displaced businesses and households, increased flood risk, increased proximity of homes and schools to the highway, decreased air quality, disjunction of Bayou Parks Greenways trail system and high cost. Michael Skelly leads the Make I-45 Better Coalition, whose mission is to decrease aforementioned impacts of the proposed project. Skelly has been quoted saying, "This is the biggest decision that Houston will make in 2020. In fact, it may be the biggest project in all of the 2020s."

Greentown Labs 
Skelly joined the Founding Advisory Board of Greentown Labs as they prepare to open their second location in Houston at the Rice Innovation District in spring 2021. Greentown labs is a Sommerville, Massachusetts-based startup incubator focused on cleantech and climatech.

Living Bank 
Skelly is a member of the advisory board of Living Bank, a Houston-based organization that works to advance living organ donation to confront the shortage of organs needed for life-saving transplants.

Houston Parks Board 

Skelly has served on the Houston Parks Board since 2010. Over the past decade Houston Parks Board launched the Bayou Greenways 2020 to connect Houston's bayous with 150 miles of continuous trail. Houston voters in 2012 approved "Proposition B", which set aside $100 million for the project. Skelly recruited Prop B's campaign team and led the fundraising effort for the campaign. The Houston Parks Board raised another $120 million from other sources to support Bayou Greenways. The public-private partnership created 3,000 acres of green space in Houston with 60% of Houstonians living within 1.5 miles of the Greenways. In an article penned by Skelly in the Houston Chronicle he states, "Bayou Greenways transcends parks, waterways and trails, these greenways have the potential to become one of our most powerful threads weaving together our city's social fabric."

Lina Hidalgo 

Lina Hidalgo is the county judge for Harris County, Texas, the third largest county in the United States. She is the first woman and the first Latinx person to be elected to the position. In 2018, Hidalgo named Skelly as a co-chair for her Talent Advisory Group. The group's role is to advise Judge-Elect Hidalgo on the naming of select, high-level staff within the County Judge's office.

Firehouse No. 2

Purchase and restoration 

In 2013, Skelly and his wife, Anne Whitlock, purchased the historic Firehouse No. 2 in the East End of Houston. The firehouse was built in 1910 and was decommissioned in the 1980s and fell into disrepair over the next 30 years. The couple had been looking for a historic industrial building to convert into a residence and community space. In addition to the firehouse, the couple rescued 6 historic Victorians that were slated for demolition and moved them onto the property adjacent to the firehouse. After a two-year rehabilitation and renovation the firehouse and Victorians, Skelly and Whitlock moved into the firehouse in 2015. The downstairs serves as a community and events space and the upstairs is the couples' residence. One of the restored Victorians serves as a guesthouse for the couple and the others were put on the market.

Hurricane Harvey 
When Hurricane Harvey hit the coast of Texas in 2017, Anne and Michael were ferrying Harvey victims from the hospital to the George R. Brown convention center in Houston.  As reported in the Washington Post the couple came across an immigrant family that was forced out of their home by the floodwaters. Knowing the convention center was rapidly filling and the firehouse stands on high ground and was at no risk of flooding, Michael and Anne opened their home to the family - a single mother and her two children, the woman's brother and a family friend. Michael posted on Facebook, urging friends to take in other hurricane refugees, helping to start a chain reaction of aid to stranded families. T

Fundraising 
Skelly is known to be a prolific fundraiser - for the boards and businesses he has worked for, and political causes.

Joe Biden 2020 Presidential Campaign 

Skelly bundled donations for the Biden 2020 campaign, and is active in organizing events focused on climate action and a renewable energy future. He has hosted fundraising calls directly with Biden on the topic. Skelly was featured as a speaker for the Give Green event, "Building National Transmission".

Published articles 
Skelly has a number of published articles on renewable energy, urban issues and infrastructure including:

Houston Chronicle 

 Houston needs new public spaces fast to save restaurants and slow COVID-19
 Houston's building codes limit city's growth
 Why is flood-prediction technology MIA?
 New ideas can help us move
 Switch to 10-foot traffic lanes can save Houston lives
 More transit choices critical if city to remain low-cost place to live

References 

1961 births
Living people
People from Houston
Texas Democrats
University of Notre Dame alumni
Harvard Business School alumni
Harvard Kennedy School alumni